Mishan is a county-level city in the southeast of Heilongjiang Province, China, bordering Russia's Primorsky Krai to the south and southeast. It is under the jurisdiction of the prefecture-level city of Jixi.

History

Early medieval history 
From 698 to 936, the kingdom of Balhae occupied northern Korea and parts of Manchuria and Primorsky Krai, consisting of the Nanai, the Udege, and descendants of the Tungus-speaking people and the people of the recently fallen Goguryeo kingdom of Korea. It bordered the Khitan people, the Shiwei people, the Silla people, and the citizens of Heisui Mohe, most of which is located in modern-day China and Mongolia. The vicinity of Tongjiang  was settled at this moment by Funie Mohe tribes. These tribes were submitted to Balhae Kingdom under King Mun's reign (737-793).

Later, King Seon (r.818-830),  administrated their territories by creating a prefecture in the neighbourhood : The Dongpyong Prefecture with Yiju, present-day Dangbi as its administrative centre.

Administrative divisions 
Mishan City is divided into 1 subdistrict, 8 towns and 8 townships. 
1 subdistrict
 Zhongxin
8 towns
 Mishan, Lianzhushan, Dangbi, Zhiyi, Heitai, Xingkai, Peide, Baiyuwan
8 townships
 Liumao, Yangmu, Xingkaihu, Chengzihe, Errenban, Taiping, Heping, Fuyuan

Climate

Sister Cities 
Juneau, Alaska

See also 

 List of Provinces of Balhae

References

External links
 Map of Mishan County

 
Balhae
Cities in Heilongjiang
County level divisions of Heilongjiang
Jixi